Bentley is an unincorporated community in Grant Parish, Louisiana, United States. Its ZIP code is 71407.

Notes

Unincorporated communities in Grant Parish, Louisiana
Unincorporated communities in Louisiana